The 1959–60 Scottish Inter-District Championship was a rugby union competition for Scotland's district teams.

This season saw the seventh formal  Scottish Inter-District Championship.

South, North and Midlands and Edinburgh District won the competition with two wins and a loss each.

Glasgow's 32 - 0 loss to the South led to calls for the Glasgow District to be partitioned into Glasgow (northwards to Stirling) as a 'city' team and a South-West district (Renfrewshire and Ayrshire to Stranraer and Wigtownshire).

1959-60 League Table

Results

Round 1

South: 

Glasgow District:

Round 2

South:

North and Midlands:

Round 3

North and Midlands:

 Edinburgh District:

Round 4

Glasgow District: 

Edinburgh District:

Round 5

Edinburgh District: 

South:

Round 6

Glasgow District: 

North and Midlands:

References

1959–60 in Scottish rugby union
Scottish Inter-District Championship seasons